George L. Luthy Memorial Botanical Garden, usually just Luthy Botanical Garden, is a  botanical garden and conservatory located in Glen Oak Park, near the corner of Prospect Avenue and Gift Avenue in Peoria, Illinois, United States.

The garden was established in 1951. It now contains more than 300 genera, with an emphasis on roses, perennials, annuals, hosta, hemerocallis, and herbs. Specific gardens include an all-season garden, herb garden, perennial garden, rose garden, viburnum collection, wildlife garden, and woodland garden.

The garden is named after George Littlewood Luthy, who was president of Peoria's Commercial National Bank (now part of PNC Bank) and a Trustee of the Peoria Park District, which owns the garden.

It is open daily. Garden admission is free; a fee is charged for the conservatory.

See also 
 List of botanical gardens in the United States

External links
Luthy Botanical Garden

Protected areas established in 1951
1951 establishments in Illinois
Luthy, George L.
Peoria, Illinois
Protected areas of Peoria County, Illinois
Tourist attractions in Peoria, Illinois
Greenhouses in Illinois
Woodland gardens